Luke Bailey (born 7 March 1984) is an Essex-born British actor, writer, director and musician, best known for playing Sam Bateman in the long-running medical drama series Casualty, and comprehensive school pupil Marley Kelly in Waterloo Road, both on BBC One.

Career

Television
Bailey started his career with a part on the Channel 4 production of The Illustrated Mum, based on the book of the same name written by Jacqueline Wilson. Bailey then went on to appear in the CBBC television show UGetMe in 2003, alongside BBC actor/presenter Reggie Yates. Bailey starred as the show's main character Joe, appearing in 49 episodes over three series.

From October 2004 until May 2007, Bailey appeared in a recurring capacity, across 109 episodes, in BBC medical drama, Casualty. He played Sam Bateman, the son of clinical nurse manager Tess Bateman (Suzanne Packer). Bailey had previously appeared in a minor role in 2002 as young child, Ben. Bailey returned to Casualty for one episode as Sam in August 2015 to coincide with Tess' departure.

In Waterloo Road, Bailey played pupil Marley Kelly, a character seven years younger than himself.

In May 2009, Bailey appeared in "Butterfly Effect", a stand-alone story in the BBC One daytime drama Moving On, with Jimmy McGovern as the executive producer. Playing Zach, the son of Sylvie (Lesley Sharp), he appeared alongside Susan Cookson and Joanne Froggatt.

Reality television
In January 2007 Bailey appeared in BBC One's pro-celebrity singing competition Just the Two of Us, in which he was paired with Atomic Kitten's Natasha Hamilton. Later on that year, in October, he swapped singing for circus performing when he appeared on Sky One's Cirque de Celebrité. He appeared in Total Wipeout broadcast on Boxing Day 2009 and was proclaimed the winner.

Theatre

Bailey toured the UK in the award-winning musical 20th Century Boy, inspired by the life of (Marc Bolan). Bailey portrayed the character of Rolan, Marc Bolan's son. In 2013 Bailey wrote and directed the play Dissociation at the Lowry Theatre in Manchester. The play received some positive reviews.

Music
Bailey is a songwriter and musician and has performed in several bands throughout his life, including playing bass guitar in Liverpool-based rock band Televaters, and vocals for Manchester-based blues-rock band, Velvet Slow Dogs. In October 2021, Bailey's band Small Black Arrows released their debut EP, entitled 'The Wave' on 42's Records to positive reviews.

Notable roles

References

External links 
 

1984 births
Living people
Black British male actors
British male television actors
Male actors from Essex